The Crown-class ships of the line were a class of three 64-gun third rates, designed for the Royal Navy by Sir Edward Hunt.

Ships

Builder: Perry, Blackwall Yard
Ordered: Unknown
Launched: 15 March 1782
Fate: Broken up, 1816

Builder: Staves & Parsons, Bursledon
Ordered: 9 September 1779
Launched: 21 December 1782
Fate: Blown up, 1794

Builder: Barnard, Deptford
Ordered: 11 November 1779
Launched: 22 October 1782
Fate: Broken up, 1798

References

Lavery, Brian (2003) The Ship of the Line - Volume 1: The development of the battlefleet 1650-1850. Conway Maritime Press. .

 
Ship of the line classes